Raffaele De Martino (born 8 April 1986) is an Italian football midfielder, currently under contract for Paganese.

Career
De Martino started his professional career with Roma. In January 2005 he was released by Roma, and successively signed by Swiss club Bellinzona. Later same year, he was loan back to Treviso of Serie A, together with Andrea Russotto. In 2006, he signed a contract with Udinese, scoring his first top flight goal but missing the whole 2007–08 season due to injury. That was the beginning of De Martino's downward spiral, as he was sold to Serie B club Avellino in 2008, and then failed to establish as a regular; a one-year stint at Crotone turned out to be as disappointing, as he was released by the end of the season. In January 2011 he signed a six-month deal with Lega Pro Prima Divisione club Nocerina, appearing only three times and not being awarded a new contract. Again without a contract, De Martino found a club only in February 2012, when Lega Pro Seconda Divisione club Paganese confirmed to have signed the player.

Internationals
He made his U-21 team debut against Luxembourg U-21, 12 December 2006, as starter.

References

External links
FIGC National team stats.

1986 births
Living people
Italian footballers
Italy under-21 international footballers
Italy youth international footballers
Italian expatriate footballers
A.S. Roma players
AC Bellinzona players
Treviso F.B.C. 1993 players
Udinese Calcio players
U.S. Avellino 1912 players
F.C. Crotone players
Serie A players
Serie B players
Swiss Challenge League players
Expatriate footballers in Switzerland
Italian expatriate sportspeople in Switzerland
Association football midfielders
Sportspeople from the Province of Salerno
People from Nocera Inferiore
Footballers from Campania